The 'Kakakhel’ are Sayyid (also spelled as Syed) and settled in Khyber Pakhtunkhwa along with other cities of Pakistan. They were very small clan till 13th of century. They are descended by Sayyid Kastir Gul titled "Kaka Sahib" from the lineage of Imam Jafar Sadiq (who was the grandson of Imam Zayn al-Abidin, the son of Imam Muhammad al-Baqir, the great-grandson of Imam Husayn ibn Ali, the martyr of Karbala, and the sixth Imam of the Shi’ah Twelvers)..

Notable Kakakhels 
 Sayyid Kastir Gul, patriarch of the Kakakhel
 Mian Hazrat Jamal Kakakhel
 Mian Muhibullah Kakakhel
 Mian Hayaud Din
 Uzair Gul Peshawari
 Syed Adnan Kakakhail

References 

Social groups of Pakistan